This is a list of Croatian television related events from 1983.

Events

Debuts

Television shows

Ending this year

Births
21 January - Nera Stipičević, singer & actress
15 May - Iva Šulentić, actress and TV & radio host

Deaths